Mitsoudjé-Troumbeni is a town on the island of Grande Comore (Ngazidja) in the Comoros. According to the 1991 census, the town had a population of 2946.

References

Populated places in Grande Comore